Shangma Subdistrict is a subdistrict in Houma, Shanxi province, China. , it has one residential community and 19 villages under its administration.

See also 
 List of township-level divisions of Shanxi

References 

Township-level divisions of Shanxi
Houma, Shanxi